Mouthwashing may refer to:

 Rinsing the human mouth with mouthwash for purposes of oral hygiene.
 Washing out mouth with soap, a form of punishment.

See also
 Mouthwash (disambiguation)